The Alfa Romeo 155 (Type 167) is a compact executive car produced by Italian automobile manufacturer Alfa Romeo between 1992 and 1998. It was unveiled in January 1992 at Barcelona, with the first public launch in March 1992, at the Geneva Motor Show. A total of 195,526 units were made before it was replaced by the 156.

Design

Developed to replace the 75 and based on the parent company Fiat Group's Type Three platform, the 155 was somewhat larger in dimension than the 75 and had evolved styling from that of its predecessor. The 155 was designed by Italian design house I.DE.A Institute. An exceptional drag coefficient of 0.29 was achieved with the body design. The boxy design of the 155 allowed for a big boot space .

The most significant technical change from the 75 was the switch to a front-wheel drive layout. A four-wheel-drive model called the 155 Q4 was also available, which had a  turbocharged engine and a permanent four-wheel drive powertrain, both derived from the Lancia Delta Integrale; it was essentially a Lancia Delta Integrale with a different body.

The new model came in "Sport" and "Super" trims. The Sport had a slightly lowered ride height and more aggressive dampers while the Super had the option of wooden trim and electronically controlled dampers and seat controls.

Reception of the 155 was generally lukewarm. The 75 had been conceived prior to Fiat's acquisition of the Alfa brand, so as the last independent Alfa Romeo automobile made it cast a shadow over the 155; the loss of rear-wheel drive was frequently cited as the main cause of disappointment. Nevertheless, the 155 was entered in Touring Car racing and was very successful in every major championship it entered, which gradually improved its image.

The 155 received a facelift in 1995 and changes included a wider body as well as a wider track and revised steering based on Alfa Romeo's racing experience. The facelift also brought in new 16 valve engines for the 1.8 and 2.0 litre models, whilst retaining the 2.5 litre V6 and making some improvements to cabin materials and build quality.

There were several Sport Packs available, including a race inspired body kit (spoiler and side skirts) and black or graphite coloured 16 inch Speedline wheels. The luxury oriented Super trim came with wood inserts in the cabin and silver-painted alloy wheels.

The 155 was never produced in the Sportwagon bodystyle (Alfa Romeo's term for an estate or station wagon), but Sbarro made a proposal for such a model in 1994 which was not put into production.

Production of the 155 ceased in 1998, when it was replaced by the 156, which was a further development in terms of quality and refinement, and finally moved away from the wedge styling — leaving the 155 as the pinnacle of that particular design stream which dated back to 1977, with the dramatic squared-off styling of the Giulietta Nuova.

Timeline
 1992 – 155 launched
 1993 – Grill design changed from “flushed” to “recessed”
 1994 – 155 1.8 T.Spark Silverstone introduced to the British market, 155 Q4 and turbodiesels to some markets
 1995 – New "widebody" series 2 155 launched with wider track and quick rack steering wheel, initially only available with 2.0 L 16v engine
 1996/6 – Widebody with 1.6 L 16v and 1.8 L 16v engines introduced
 1998 – Production ends

Specifications and special editions

The 155 was initially available with 1.7 L Twin Spark, 1.8 L Twin Spark, and 2.0 L Twin Spark petrol engines, the latter two were equipped with variable valve timing. The 1.7 L was not sold in the United Kingdom.

Two four cylinder turbocharged diesel engines, a Fiat derived 1.9 L and a VM Motori 2.5 L were available in some markets, except for the United Kingdom.

At the top of the 155 range were the 2.5 L V6, using a  engine derived from the 3.0 L V6 used in the larger 164, and the Q4 which used a drivetrain derived from the Lancia Delta Integrale which meant a  2.0 L 16V turbocharged engine and permanent four-wheel drive.

The Q4 also incorporated three differential gears (normal at the front, epicyclic at the centre (including a Ferguson viscous coupling) and torsen self-locking at the rear). Both the 2.5 V6 and Q4 models were also available with electronically adjustable suspension with two damper settings (automatic and sport).

The most notable special edition was the "Silverstone" edition released in the United Kingdom which was known as the "Formula" in Europe: this was intended as a homologation exercise to allow Alfa Romeo to compete in the British Touring Car Championship race series and consequently came with a bolt on aero kit, consisting of an adjustable rear spoiler and extendable front air splitter. These changes caused controversy during the 1994 BTCC as it was seen as an unfair advantage to many, and after missing 2 races Alfa Romeo were forced to remove the aero kit from the car to finish the championship. 

The Silverstone was a lighter but no more powerful version of the 1.8 L, even though the race car it was homologating had a 2.0 L engine.  This anomaly came about because the 1.8 L engine block, with its narrower bore, allowed Alfa to use a longer stroke on the racing car and stay within the 2.0 L capacity limit.

The Silverstone was only available in either Alfa red or Black paintwork with plain, unpainted bumpers.

Facelift

In 1995, the 155 was given an extensive revamp, resulting in wider front and rear tracks with subtle enlargement to the wheel arches to accommodate the changes underneath.

The revised car also received a quicker steering rack, with 2.2 turns lock to lock (initially only on the 2.0 litre model, but later followed by the 1.8 litre). The four cylinder cars retained the twin spark ignition system but received the Alfa Romeo designed 16 valve cylinder heads with belt driven camshafts based on engine blocks of Fiat design. They replaced the elderly 8 valve, chain driven camshaft motors of the earlier models.

The 2.5 L V6 engine continued in wide body form (but without the steering changes) while the Q4 was discontinued. In Europe, the 1.7 L Twin Spark was replaced by a 1.6 L 16 valve Twin Spark. Some 8 valve engines continued in series 2 cars in some markets. The wide bodied cars also received revised interiors and equipment specifications to keep the cars competitive in the market.

The wide body ("Series 2") 155s can be distinguished from their earlier counterparts by their flared front and smooth rear wheel arches (the latter replacing the lip round the wheel arch of the original). They also sported round or oblong indicator side-repeaters and had their model badges moved below the rear lights rather than having them above.

Engines

155 GTA Stradale

In 1992, Alfa Romeo on the wake of the wins obtained by the 155 GTA in the Italian CIVT championship, decided to start the production of a "Stradale" version to be manufactured at the Abarth workshop. The car was displayed at Bologna Motor Show and being used at Monza GP d'Italia as safety car.

Designed by Abarth engineer Sergio Limone, the Stradale used the 155 Q4 as a base using its drivetrain and four-wheel drive system. The interior was stripped of some creature comforts and the car was fitted with a race inspired body kit with a large rear spoiler. Only one unit was made before the project was abandoned due to high manufacturing costs.

155 TI.Z and GTAZ

Two special editions of the 155 were made by Zagato. In 1993, the 155 TI.Z was introduced, followed by the 155 GTAZ in 1995. Both models were built only in limited numbers and many of the cars were sent to Japan.

Motorsport
The 155 was very successful in touring car racing, using the Supertouring-homologated GTA and the V6 TI for the DTM. Between 1992 and 1994, the 155 managed to take the Italian Superturismo Championship, the German DTM championship (both with Nicola Larini at the wheel), the Spanish Touring Car Championship (with Adrián Campos), and the British Touring Car Championship (with Gabriele Tarquini).

The 155 remained competitive until it was replaced with the 156, finishing third in the DTM (then known as the International Touring Car Championship, or ITC) in 1996 with Alessandro Nannini and winning the Spanish championship again in 1997 with Fabrizio Giovanardi. In 1993, Larini in an Alfa 155 placed second in the FIA Touring Car Challenge behind Paul Radisich in a Ford Mondeo. The 156 was to continue the high standard set by the 155, winning the European Touring Car Championship multiple times.

155 V6 TI

The Alfa Romeo 155 V6 TI was a FIA Class 1 touring car that Alfa Corse raced from 1993 to 1996 in the Deutsche Tourenwagen Meisterschaft and the subsequent International Touring Car Championship.

Alfa Corse entered two 155 V6 TIs for works drivers Alessandro Nannini and Nicola Larini; the 1993 season was dominated by Larini winning 11 of 22 races.

In 1994, the rivals from Mercedes seemed to have the advantage, but Alfa did manage to win a further eleven races. A more consistent performance from the Germans gave them the title. Since the 1995 season, the team got new sponsorship livery from Martini Racing.

.

The Alfa 155 V6 TI has a record of 38 wins (plus 3 other non championship races). The victories were obtained by seven different drivers: 17 (+1) Nicola Larini, 13 (+1) Alessandro Nannini, 2 Stefano Modena, 2 (+1) Christian Danner, 2 Michael Bartels, 1 Kris Nissen and 1 Gabriele Tarquini.

References

External links

 Synthesis design of the Alfa Romeo GTA

155
Compact executive cars
Sports sedans
155
Front-wheel-drive vehicles
All-wheel-drive vehicles
Cars introduced in 1992
Touring cars